Wickham Market is a large village and electoral ward situated in the River Deben valley of Suffolk, England, within the Suffolk Coastal heritage area.

It is a large village with 2,204 residents living in 953 dwellings (2001 census). 27.59% of the population are between the ages of 40 and 59 and 23.19% of residents reside in council or housing association homes. The population at the 2011 Census had decreased to 2,156.

Wickham Market's All Saints Church is over 700 years old and its octagonal tower and lead spire (137.5 feet tall) dominate the skyline and make it visible for miles over the surrounding countryside. The exterior of the church is stone and flintwork. Inside there are four stained glass windows, a 600-year-old font, a carved pulpit and an altar table with a painted reredos. There are six bells in the tower and a Sanctus Bell in the cote. Nearby attractions include: Valley Farm Equestrian Visitor Centre, Easton Farm Park, Glevering Hall, the Snape Maltings, Framlingham Castle and Sutton Hoo.

Notable residents 
 Francis Lucas (1850–1918), businessman and Conservative Member of Parliament for Lowestoft 1900–1906

 Chinwe Chukwuogo-Roy MBE (1952–2012), Royal Portrait painter best known for her many studies of famous people, the portrait for the Golden Jubilee of Elizabeth II and her innovative techniques.
 Flora Sandes (1876–1956), the only British female soldier to officially serve in World War 1.

Wickham Mill
Wickham Mill is a grade II* listed watermill dating from the 18th century. The machinery is complete and in working order. In 1893 mill owner Reuben Rackham purchased a Whitmore and Binyon horizontal condensing steam-engine for his mill, priced at £25,000, to drive the entire plant. The engine was installed in July 1893 and the entire plant was operational by October of the same year. The engine was last worked in 1957 and was subsequently moved to Museum of East Anglian Life in Stowmarket as a gift of Edward and Robert Rackham, Rueben Rackham's sons.

Wickham Market Hoard

In 2009 it was announced that one of the largest Iron Age coin finds had been discovered at a site near Wickham Market.

The  hoard of 840 Iron Age gold staters was found in March 2008, in a field at Dallinghoo near the village, by car mechanic, Michael Dark using a metal detector. After excavation of the site, a total of 825 coins were found, and by the time the hoard was declared treasure trove, 840 coins had been discovered.

The hoard was described as "the largest hoard of British Iron Age gold coins to be studied in its entirety", and was also significant in providing "a lot of new information about the Iron Age, and particularly East Anglia in the late Iron Age". It was the largest hoard of staters to be found since the Whaddon Chase Iron Age hoard in 1849.

The coins dated from 40 BC–15 AD and, at the time, would have been worth between £500,000–£1,000,000 to the Iceni tribes who inhabited the area.

References

External links
Village website

Villages in Suffolk
Civil parishes in Suffolk